In graph theory, Brooks' theorem states a relationship between the maximum degree of a graph and its chromatic number. According to the theorem, in a connected graph in which every vertex has at most Δ neighbors, the vertices can be colored with only Δ colors, except for two cases, complete graphs and cycle graphs of odd length, which require Δ + 1 colors.

The theorem is named after R. Leonard Brooks, who published a proof of it in 1941. A coloring with the number of colors described by Brooks' theorem is sometimes called a Brooks coloring or a Δ-coloring.

Formal statement
For any connected undirected graph G with maximum degree Δ,
the chromatic number of G is at most Δ, unless G is a complete graph or an odd cycle, in which case the chromatic number is Δ + 1.

Proof
 gives a simplified proof of Brooks' theorem. If the graph is not biconnected, its biconnected components may be colored separately and then the colorings combined. If the graph has a vertex v with degree less than Δ, then a greedy coloring algorithm that colors vertices farther from v before closer ones uses at most Δ colors. This is because at the time that each vertex other than v is colored, at least one of its neighbors (the one on a shortest path to v) is uncolored, so it has fewer than Δ colored neighbors and has a free color. When the algorithm reaches v, its small number of neighbors allows it to be colored. Therefore, the most difficult case of the proof concerns biconnected Δ-regular graphs with Δ ≥ 3. In this case, Lovász shows that one can find a spanning tree such that two nonadjacent neighbors u and w of the root v are leaves in the tree. A greedy coloring starting from u and w and processing the remaining vertices of the spanning tree in bottom-up order, ending at v, uses at most Δ colors. For, when every vertex other than v is colored, it has an uncolored parent, so its already-colored neighbors cannot use up all the free colors, while at v the two neighbors u and w have equal colors so again a free color remains for v itself.

Extensions
A more general version of the theorem applies to list coloring: given any connected undirected graph with maximum degree Δ that is neither a clique nor an odd cycle, and a list of Δ colors for each vertex, it is possible to choose a color for each vertex from its list so that no two adjacent vertices have the same color. In other words, the list chromatic number of a connected undirected graph G never exceeds Δ, unless G is a clique or an odd cycle. A small modification of the proof of Lovász applies to this case: for the same three vertices u, v, and w from that proof, either give u and w the same color as each other (if possible), or otherwise give one of them a color that is unavailable to v, and then complete the coloring greedily as before.

For certain graphs, even fewer than Δ colors may be needed.  shows that Δ − 1 colors suffice if and only if the given graph has no Δ-clique, provided Δ is large enough. For triangle-free graphs, or more generally graphs in which the neighborhood of every vertex is sufficiently sparse, O(Δ/log Δ) colors suffice.

The degree of a graph also appears in upper bounds for other types of coloring; for edge coloring, the result that the chromatic index is at most Δ + 1 is Vizing's theorem. An extension of Brooks' theorem to total coloring, stating that the total chromatic number is at most Δ + 2, has been conjectured by Mehdi Behzad and Vizing. The Hajnal–Szemerédi theorem on equitable coloring states that any graph has a (Δ + 1)-coloring in which the sizes of any two color classes differ by at most one.

Algorithms
A Δ-coloring, or even a Δ-list-coloring, of a degree-Δ graph may be found in linear time. Efficient algorithms are also known for finding Brooks colorings in parallel and distributed models of computation.

Notes

References

.
.
.
.
.
.
.
.
.

External links

Graph coloring
Theorems in graph theory